Genostar is a bioinformatics provider based in Grenoble, France. The company was founded in 2004 following the "Genostar consortium" that was created in 1999 as a public-private consortium by Genome Express, Hybrigenics, INRIA (Institut National de Recherche en Informatique et Automatique / French National Institute for Research in Computer Science and Control) and The Pasteur Institute.

Software
Metabolic Pathway Builder is a bioinformatics environment dedicated to microbial research. This covers sequence assembly, mapping, annotation transfer and identification of protein domains, comparative genomics, structural searches, metabolic pathway analysis, modeling and simulation of biological networks. Genostar's software is platform independent and can thus be used for both Mac OS X, Windows, and Linux.

Sequence assembly
Mapping an ensemble of sequences on a reference sequence
between a reference sequence and contigs, between two sequences or between two sets of sequences
finding of exact matches with minimum length using MUMmer
detection of specific regions and SNPs
creation of an assembled sequence relative to reference sequences

Genomic annotation
 Gene prediction: ab-initio gene prediction using a Hidden Markov model based method
 BlastX
 Automatic annotation transfer using BlastP

Proteic annotation
Metabolic Pathway Builder integrates several methods dedicated to proteic annotation:
 Pfam domain prediction using HMMER
 Several EMBOSS methods (antigenic, 2D structure prediction)

Expression Data Solution (EDS)
Genostar's Expression Data Solution (EDS) connects microarray data to genes, gene products and biochemical reactions, based on keywords and annotations. This software allows to:
 Assign expression values to the gene names and IDs
 Identify co-expressed genes and visually analyze the reactions and metabolic pathways in which they are involved
 Identify and perform analysis on co-regulated genes in terms of genomic localization, functional annotation and metabolism
 Colorize CDSs of interest in genomic maps according to their expression values and highlight the corresponding reactions in interactive metabolic KEGG maps
 Analyze the significance of functional data of a collection or sub-collection of CDSs (GO, KEGG and more): Fisher test
 Collect and visualize all functional data in exportable tables and maps

Database 
Genostar's MicroB database consists of genomic, proteic, biochemical and metabolic data from approximately 1100 bacterial and archaeal organis.

Partners
  INRIA (Institut National de Recherche en Informatique et Automatique / French National Institute for Research in Computer Science and Control)
 Swiss Institute of Bioinformatics
 ChemAxon

Notes and references

External links 
 Genostar Expands Deal with Biopharma Merial To Help Hunt Pathogenic Virulence Factors
 Genostar at Bio 2010

Software companies of France
Software companies established in 2004
Biotechnology companies of France
Bioinformatics companies
Privately held companies of France
Science and technology in Grenoble
Biotechnology companies established in 2004
2004 establishments in France